Nik Đeljošaj (born 12 November 1979) is a Montenegrin politician of Albanian ethnicity. He has been serving as the Mayor of Tuzi since 23 March 2019.

Biography
He is the leader of Albanian Alternative. In the 2020 Montenegrin parliamentary election, he was the ballot carrier of the Albanian List, an minority politics coalition, formed by New Democratic Force (FORCA), the Albanian Alternative (AA), Albanian Coalition Perspective (AKP) and the Democratic League of Albanians (DSA). The new coalition won 1.58% of the vote and gained a singular seat in the Parliament of Montenegro, which belonged to Gjeloshaj.

See also 

 Albanian Alternative
 Albanian List (Montenegro)

References 

Albanians in Montenegro
Malesia
Mayors of places in Montenegro
1979 births
Living people
Members of the Parliament of Montenegro